This is the list of episodes for The Late Late Show with James Corden. A total of  episodes have aired.

Episodes

2015

2016

2017

2018

2019

2020

2021

2022

2023

References

External links
 James Corden on Twitter
 The Late Late Show with James Corden at CBS
 The Late Late Show with James Corden on Twitter
 The Late Late Show with James Corden on Facebook
 

Late Late Show with James Corden
Late Late Show with James Corden
Episodes